The Invisible Ray may refer to:

 The Invisible Ray (1920 serial), film serial directed by Harry A. Pollard
 The Invisible Ray (1936 film), film starring Boris Karloff and Béla Lugosi